Alias is the self-titled debut album from the Canadian rock band Alias, released in 1990 by Capitol Records.

The single "More Than Words Can Say" reached No. 1 in Canada and No. 2 in the United States. A third single, "Waiting for Love", was released in early 1991 and peaked at No. 13 on the U.S. Billboard Hot 100.

Track listing 
 "Say What I Wanna Say" (F. Curci, S. DeMarchi) (4:45)
 "Haunted Heart" (F. Curci, S. DeMarchi, S. Diamond) (3:52)
 "Waiting for Love" (B. Walker, J. Paris) (4:38)
 "The Power" (F. Curci, S. DeMarchi) (4:26)
 "Heroes" (F. Curci, S. DeMarchi) (5:22)
 "What to Do" (F. Curci, S. DeMarchi) (4:18)
 "After All the Love Is Gone" (F. Curci, S. DeMarchi, R. Neigher, J. Paris) (4:17)
 "More Than Words Can Say" (F. Curci, S. DeMarchi) (3:54)
 "One More Chance" (R. Neigher, Fee Waybill, J. Dexter) (3:37)
 "True Emotion" (F. Curci, S. DeMarchi) (4:59)
 "Standing in the Darkness" (F. Curci, S. DeMarchi, D. DeMarchi) (4:34)

Personnel 
 Freddy Curci – lead vocals, keyboards
 Steve DeMarchi – guitars
 Roger Fisher – guitars
 Mike Derosier – drums
 Steve Fossen – bass

Additional musicians 
 Denny DeMarchi – keyboards, backing vocals

Production 
 Engineered by George Tutko and Dave Runstedler
 Additional Engineering by Peter Doell, Eddie De Lena, Denny DeMarchi, Freddy Curci and Steve DeMarchi.
 Assisted by Kyle Bess, Charlie Paakkari and Fred Kelly, Jr.
 Mixed by George Tutko and Eddie De Lena
 Arrangements by Steve DeMarchi and Freddy Curci
 Mastered by Greg Calbi at Sterling Sound, New York City
 A&R Direction by Tim Trombley, Randy Nicklaus and Jody Mitchell.
 Production Coordination by Mark Sullivan (Emerald Productions), Deborah Critten and Sharon Gaudet (Capitol Canada).
 Art Direction and Design by Hugh Syme
 Sculpture by Randall Cooper
 Photography by John Scarpati
 Art Direction for Capitol by R. Alfonso
 Management by Allen Kovac and Jeff Sydney (Left Bank Management).

Notes

External links
 Freddy Curci website
 www.myspace.com/theofficialalias
 Rolling Stone review

1990 debut albums
Alias (band) albums
Capitol Records albums